A rabbit vibrator (also known as a Jack Rabbit vibrator or Jessica Rabbit vibrator) is a vibrating sex toy, usually made in the shape of a phallic shaft for vaginal stimulation with a clitoral stimulator attached to the shaft. The name of the device is derived from the fact that the clitoral stimulator looks like a pair of rabbit ears. The first rabbit vibrator appeared on the market in 1984 and, along with the magic wand vibrator, is considered by  Cosmopolitan magazine to be one of the classic sex toys.

Their popularity was boosted in the United States after an episode of HBO's Sex and the City ("The Turtle and the Hare") featured Vibratex's Rabbit Pearl. The rabbit was chosen for the show because it was a bestseller at a store in New York.

Rabbit vibrators are designed to give more intense sensations than the more traditional dildo or clitoral stimulator, by providing simultaneous vaginal and clitoral stimulation. The Rabbit Pearl, the original device, also had a rotating section.

Since then the rabbit vibrator has evolved and become a whole genre of sex toys with many different brands and variations in design including ones with a less phallic shape or without the rotating beads section. The device can be used in a variety of ways and for both solo sexual play and during partnered sex.

History
Company owner Shay Martin says Vibratex was the first company to import dual-action vibrators to the United States in 1983. These vibrators were imported from Japan and were manufactured in bright colours and shaped to look like beavers, kangaroos and turtles to get around the country’s obscenity laws, unlike previous imports from China that had been designed to resemble a realistic phallus. Martin credits their colouring and cuteness as making them more appealing to women and leading to the market success of the Rabbit. Designers at Vibratex had been working on a new version that added rotating pearls to the base of the shaft of the dual-action vibrators. In 1984 the Rabbit Pearl was released. From 1985 onwards Rabbit Pearl imitators flooded the market including Susan Colvin’s Jack Rabbit for adult magazine company CPLC and the Rampant Rabbit for the UK sex toy party company Ann Summers.

Materials 
Normally rabbit vibrators are made out of a jelly-like substance (polyvinyl chloride), silicone (semi-organic polymer), rubber (elastic hydrocarbon polymer) or latex (natural rubber) materials. Silicone vibrators are easier to clean and care for, since this material is not porous; therefore no bacteria or foreign matter is absorbed by the toy. Silicone retains heat and has no odour. Jelly material is porous and cannot be sterilised in boiling water and has a scent of rubber that some find unappealing. In order to escape this smell some producers aromatise the products with more pleasurable scents. Rabbit vibrators made from vinyl, plastic, metal, and elastomer materials can be also found. They are much less porous than jelly, or entirely non-porous, but the texture is smooth and firm.

Use and pleasure 
Rabbit vibrators are designed for simultaneous internal (vaginal) and external (clitoral) stimulation. The rabbit-shaped stimulator is held near the clitoris, while the shaft is taken into the vagina, offering deep, "all around" stimulation. Most models offer a choice of shaft rotation speeds and patterns of clitoral stimulation.

While using a rabbit vibrator, users may benefit from using additional lubrication, as jelly can absorb the body's natural lubrication, and both jelly and silicone create friction against skin. Lack of moisture may cause irritation, discomfort or pain.

Commentary 
The rabbit vibrator has been described as "one of the most visible contemporary signs of active female sexuality". The appeal of the rabbit vibrator is its ability to give clitoral and vaginal stimulation at the same time.

See also 
 Anal vibrator
 G-spot vibrator
 Hitachi Magic Wand
 Vibrator (sex toy)

References

External links 
 Rabbit Fever (film about the vibrator) at IMDB database
 

Female sex toys
Vibrators